Ioannis or Giannis Kondis ( born  Albi Kondi , 4 January 1989) is a Greek footballer who plays for Pannaxiakos as striker. He was born in Albania.

References

External links 
Profile at Soccerway
Myplayer.gr Profile

1989 births
Living people
Footballers from Gjirokastër
Albanian footballers
Association football forwards
Greek footballers
Panionios F.C. players
Chaidari F.C. players
Apollon Pontou FC players
Rodos F.C. players
A.P.S. Zakynthos players
A.O. Glyfada players
Fostiras F.C. players
Super League Greece players
Albanian expatriate footballers
Expatriate footballers in Greece